is a Quasi-National Park in Akita and Yamagata Prefectures, Japan. Established in 1963, the park's central feature is the twin volcano of Mount Chōkai, although it also includes coastal areas of northern Yamagata and southern Akita Prefectures. It is rated a protected landscape (category V) according to the IUCN.

Like all Quasi-National Parks in Japan, the park is managed by the local prefectural governments.

Related municipalities
 Akita: Nikaho, Yurihonjō
 Yamagata: Sakata, Yuza

See also
 National Parks of Japan

References
Southerland, Mary and Britton, Dorothy. The National Parks of Japan. Kodansha International (1995).

External links

National parks of Japan
Parks and gardens in Akita Prefecture
Parks and gardens in Yamagata Prefecture
Protected areas established in 1963
1963 establishments in Japan